HMS Aboukir was a 74-gun third-rate ship of the line of the Royal Navy, launched on 18 November 1807 at Frindsbury.

In 1812 Aboukir served as the flagship to Rear-Admiral Thomas Byam Martin in the Baltic Sea and participated in the defence of Riga.

She was placed on harbour service in 1824, and was sold in 1838.

Notes

References

 Lavery, Brian (2003) The Ship of the Line - Volume 1: The development of the battlefleet 1650-1850. Conway Maritime Press. .
 

 

Ships of the line of the Royal Navy
Courageux-class ships of the line
1807 ships
Ships built in Frindsbury